Bazzania bhutanica is a species of liverwort in the family Lepidoziaceae.

Distribution
It is endemic to Bhutan.

Habitat
Its natural habitat is subtropical or tropical dry forests. It is threatened by habitat loss. It is recorded to be a critically endangered species. Human activity and deforestation has resulted in habitat loss. It is known to be found on crumbling shaded rock faces in subtropical forest.

References

Lepidoziaceae
Endemic flora of Bhutan
Critically endangered flora of Asia
Plants described in 1986
Taxonomy articles created by Polbot